Melba Johnson Kgositsile (1940–1994) was an American civil rights activist.  She spent much of her life in New York City, where she was the executive director of the Council on Interracial Books for Children.  She was also a vocal critic of apartheid and a supporter of the African National Congress.

References
"Melba J. Kgositsile, Civil Rights Advocate, 54." The New York Times, April 9, 1994. Accessed through Lexis-Nexis.

1940 births
1994 deaths
Activists for African-American civil rights
Melba